Khalid Al-Shehhi (Arabic:خالد الشحي) (born 17 July 1997) is an Emirati footballer who plays as a midfielder for Ittihad Kalba.

Career
Al-Shehhi started his career at Ittihad Kalba and is a product of the Ittihad Kalba's youth system. On 8 May 2015, Al-Shehhi made his professional debut for Ittihad Kalba against Emirates Club in the Pro League, replacing Said Fettah . landed with Ittihad Kalba from the UAE Pro League to the UAE First Division League in 2014-15 season. ended up with Ittihad Kalba from the First Division League to the Pro League in the 2015-16 season. landed again with Ittihad Kalba from the Pro League to the First Division League in 2016-17 season. ended up with Ittihad Kalba from the First Division League to the Pro League in the 2017-18 season.

References

External links
 

1997 births
Living people
Emirati footballers
Al-Ittihad Kalba SC players
Al Bataeh Club players
UAE Pro League players
UAE First Division League players
Association football midfielders
Place of birth missing (living people)